Chrysolina lepida is a species of beetle from Chrysomelidae family, that could be found in Iberian peninsula, Southern France, Italy, and Northwest Africa.

Description
Both males and females are of the same length, but have different colour of legs. Females have orange, while males have black.

References

Beetles described in 1807
Chrysomelinae
Taxa named by Guillaume-Antoine Olivier